Macfarlane Park is a neighborhood in the West Tampa district of Tampa, Florida, which represents District 6 of the Tampa City Council. The 2000 census numbers were unavailable; however, the latest estimated population was 1,754.

Geography
MacFarlane Park is located at 27.958632 and -82.495373.

Macfarlane Park boundaries are roughly Himes Avenue to the west, Beach Street to the north, Cypress Street/Main Street to the south and Mac Dill Avenue/New Jersey Avenue to the east. The ZIP Code serving the neighborhood is 33607.

Demographics
The latest estimated population was 1,754; which consists of 836 males and 918 females. The median age is 42.8 for males and 47.7 for females. The percentage of marriage couple stands at 51%.

The median income for the neighborhood is $36,875. The average family size is 2.6 and the average household size is approximately 3.0 persons.

Education
Macfarlane Park is served by Hillsborough County Public Schools, which serves the city of Tampa and Hillsborough County.

See also
Northeast Macfarlane

References

External links
MacFarlane neighborhood in Tampa, Florida (FL), 33607 detailed profile
MacFarelane Park (in Hillsborough County, FL) Populated Place Profile
Macfarlane Park Pictures

Neighborhoods in Tampa, Florida